Peter Rehberg (29 June 1968 – 22 July 2021), also known as Pita, was a British-Austrian composer of electronic audio works.  He was the head of Editions Mego, which he founded in 2006 as a successor to Mego.

Early life
Rehberg was born in Tottenham on 29 June 1968.  He grew up in Hertfordshire, before relocating to Austria, his father's country of origin.

Career
Rehberg became associated with Mego in the latter part of 1994.  He consequently released his first single early the following year, which was also the first release in the record label's catalogue.  He followed this up with his debut album titled Seven Tons for Free in 1996, released under the name Pita.  Three years later, Rehberg received Prix Ars Electronica Distinction Award for Digital Musics, alongside Christian Fennesz.

Rehberg cooperated with various musicians such as Mika Vainio, Charlemagne Palestine and Oren Ambarchi.  He produced music with Ramon Bauer starting in 1997 as Rehberg & Bauer.  After Mego folded in 2005, Rehberg revived the label the following year as Editions Mego.  He also collaborated with Stephen O'Malley starting in 2006, releasing six drone doom albums as KTL.  With Fennesz and Jim O'Rourke, he founded the project Fenn O'Berg.

Rehberg released A Bas la Culture Marchande in 2007, followed by the live collaboration Colchester (2008) and the cassette Mesmer (2010).  He started an archival project in 2012 called Recollection GRM.  It reissued music by the Groupe de Recherches Musicales collective, including by Pierre Schaeffer, Bernard Parmegiani, Iannis Xenakis, and Beatriz Ferreyra.

In an interview conducted in 2016, Rehberg stated that he did not want to peddle music "in its own little box", which he felt was the norm at present.  Describing his impression regarding timbre, he believed that "dissonance and resonance have to co-exist for the other to work".  François Bonnet, who collaborated with Rehberg on Recollection GRM, felt that his music came to be more dense as his career progressed.  He described how it retained its "radical and bold" character, while becoming "deeper, more ambivalent, more moving".

Personal life
Rehberg was in a domestic partnership with Laura Siegmund until his death.  He was previously in a relationship with Isabelle Piechaczyk, with whom he had one child.

Rehberg died on 22 July 2021.  He was 53, and had suffered a heart attack prior to his death.

Selected discography
 (1995) General Magic & Pita: Fridge Trax 12" (Mego)
 (1996) Pita: Seven Tons For Free CD (Mego)
 (1996) General Magic & Pita: Live & Final Fridge LP/CD (Source)
 (1997) Rehberg & Bauer: faßt CD (Touch)
 (1999) Rehberg & Bauer: ballt CD (Touch)
 (1999) Pita: Get Out CD (Mego)
 (1999) Fennesz/O'Rourke/Rehberg: The Magic Sound Of Fenn O'Berg CD (Mego)
(2002) Fennesz/O'Rourke/Rehberg: The Return of Fenn O'Berg CD (Mego)

 (2001) Rehberg & Bauer: passt CD (Touch)
 (2002) Pita: Get Down LP (Mego)
 (2002) DACM: Showroom Dummies CD (Mego)
 (2002) Fennesz/O'Rourke/Rehberg: The Return Of Fenn O’Berg CD/LP (Mego)

 (2004) Pita: Get Off (Häpna)

 (2007) Pita: A Bas la Culture Marchande  (No Fun Productions)
 (2007) KTL (Stephen O'Malley & Peter Rehberg): KTL2 (Editions Mego)
 (2007) KTL (Stephen O'Malley & Peter Rehberg): KTL3 (Or)
 (2007) R/S (Rehberg/Schmickler): One  (Erstwhile)
 (2007) KTL (Stephen O'Malley & Peter Rehberg): Live In Krems (Editions Mego)
 (2008) Pita: Get Out (Editions Mego Version)  (Editions Mego)
 (2008) Z'EV vs PITA: Colchester (Editions Mego)
 (2008) Peter Rehberg: Work For GV 2004–2008 (Editions Mego)
 (2009) KTL (Stephen O'Malley & Peter Rehberg): IV (Editions Mego)
 (2011) R/S: USA (PAN)
 (2016) Pita: Get In CD (Editions Mego)
 (2020) KTL (Stephen O'Malley & Peter Rehberg): VII (Editions Mego)
 (2022) Peter Rehberg: At GRM (Portraits GRM)

References

External links
Editions Mego website
 
 

1968 births
2021 deaths
Free improvisation
British experimental musicians
Electroacoustic improvisation
People from Tottenham
People from St Albans
Computer music